Berchtold of Engelberg, German Berchtold von Engelberg (died 3 November 1197) was a Swiss German Benedictine monk, who was Abbot of Engelberg Abbey in Switzerland.

Biography
Before becoming abbot he was a monk at Engelberg and a favorite disciple of the learned abbot, Blessed Frowin. When Frowin was on the point of dying he advised his monks to elect Berchtold as his successor. Accordingly, after Frowin's death, which occurred 27 March 1178, Berchtold was chosen abbot.

Following in Frowin's footsteps, he was intent on maintaining strict monastic discipline, the importance of which he inculcated by his own example. Nor did he neglect, at the same time, to encourage his monks in the pursuit of Divine and human knowledge. By his order they reproduced many old writings, some of which are still extant in the library of Engelberg. The more learned monks were encouraged to write original works.

When Abbot Burchard openly taught that the souls of the just had gone to heaven before the Resurrection of Christ, Berchtold himself wrote Apologia contra errorem Burchardi Abbatis S. Joannis in Thurthal seu Vallis Taurinae, in which he shows himself not only well versed in Holy Scriptures and the writings of the Fathers but also a master in theological knowledge and dialectical skill. Abbot Burchard became convinced of his error, retracted, and died a saintly death.

Berchtold procured for his monastery many financial privileges, among which was the right to levy tithes upon the churches of Stanz and Buochs, which were under his jurisdiction. The contemporaneous annals of Engelberg, which are published in "Mon. Germ. Hist., SS.", XVII, 280, relate that Berchtold foretold the death of Emperor Frederick Barbarossa. Later chronicles state that, through his blessing, the lake near Stanzstad was stocked with fish, and that shortly before his death he three times changed water into wine. He is generally represented in the act of blessing fish. His miracle of turning water into wine is corroborated by an epigram beneath a representation of him which was kept in the choir of Engelberg up to the seventeenth century. At Engelberg his feast is celebrated on the anniversary of his death, and within the Roman Catholic Church he is now also known as "Blessed Berchtold".

Notes

References

Acta Sanctorum (Paris, 1887), 1 November 385;
Murer, Helvetia Sancta (Lucerne, 1648; St. Gall, 1751);
Burgener, Helvetia Sancta (Einsiedeln and New York, 1860), I, 80;
Versuch einer urkundlichen Darstellung des reichsfreien Stiftes Engelberg (Lucerne, 1846);
Mayer, Das Benediktiner Stift Engelberg (Lucerne, 1891)

External links

1197 deaths
Swiss Benedictines
Swiss abbots
Benedictine abbots
12th-century venerated Christians
Year of birth unknown